Antoni Muntadas (Barcelona, 1942) is a postconceptual multimedia artist, who resides in New York since 1971. His work often addresses social, political and communications issues through different media: such as photography, video, text and image publications, the Internet, and multi-media installations.

Artwork
From a critical perspective, his work addresses social, political, and communications issues from all around the world, such as the relationship between public and private space within specific social frameworks, and investigates channels of information, and the ways they may be used to censor or promulgate ideas. Following this line, he coined the terms media landscape – to allude the "ever-expanding presence" of mass media, advertising and audiovisual material in the public space – and "critical subjectivity" – to refer to the critical modes of perception, thought, and subject configuration. These concepts are key to understand his artistic proposal.

His projects are presented in different mediums, such as photography, video, publications, the Internet, installations and urban interventions, and have been exhibited in numerous museums, including the Museum of Modern Art in New York, the Berkeley Art Museum in California, the Musée Contemporain de Montreal, the Museo Nacional Centro de Arte Reina Sofía in Madrid, the Museo de Arte Moderno in Buenos Aires, the Museu de Arte Moderna in Rio de Janeiro, the Musée Jeu de Paume in Paris and the Museu d’Art Contemporani de Barcelona, among others. In addition, his works have been presented in different international events: VI and X editions of Documenta Kassel (1977, 1997), the Whitney Biennal of American Art (1991), the 51st Venice Biennial (1976, 2005) and those in São Paulo, Lyon, Taipei, Gwangju, Istanbul and La Havana. Muntadas with the Catalan artist Antoni Miralda held a collective exhibition at the PalmaDotze gallery in Santa Margarida los Monjos (Penedès) to celebrate its 30th Anniversary.

Within the academic field, Muntadas has taught and directed seminars at diverse institutions throughout Europe and the United States, including the National School of Fine Arts in Paris, the Fine Arts Schools in Bordeaux and Grenoble, the University of California in San Diego, the San Francisco Art Institute, the Cooper Union in New York, the Fine Arts Academy in Beijing (CAFA), the Art University in Tokyo, the University of São Paulo, and the University of Buenos Aires. He has also been invited as a resident artist and consulting advisor at various research and education centers including the Visual Studies Workshop in Rochester, the Banff Centre in Alberta, Arteleku in San Sebastian, The National Studio for Contemporary Arts Le Fresnoy, and the University of Western Sydney. He maintained a relationship with the MIT in Cambridge for longer than 35 years (1977-2014), which is of special importance. There, Muntadas first exercised as a research fellow, then as a lecturer and professor in practice. Currently, he is teaching at the Veneto Institute of Architecture in Venice.

Muntadas has received several prizes and grants, including those of the John Simon Guggenheim Memorial Foundation, the Rockefeller Foundation, the National Endowment for the Arts, the New York State Council on the Arts, Arts Electronica in Linz, Laser d'Or in Locarno, the Premi Nacional d’Arts Plàstiques awarded by the Catalan Government and the 2005 National Award for Plastic Arts (Spain). One of his most recent awards is the Premio Velázquez de las Artes Plásticas 2009 granted by the Spanish Ministry of Culture.

Projects
Most important Muntadas projects between 1971 and 2019:

Collections
Some important collections with Muntadas works:

Notes

External links
The Muntadas Archive Association (ARXIU/AM)
The File Room
On Translation
Antonio Muntadas in the Video Data Bank
Antoni Muntadas at Mediateca Media Art space

1942 births
Living people
Artists from Catalonia
Spanish contemporary artists
People from Barcelona
Artists from New York City
American conceptual artists
American installation artists